This is a list of countries by net goods exports according to the CIA World Factbook. This list includes some non-sovereign entities, but only sovereign territories are ranked. Countries with positive net exports have a trade surplus, countries with negative net exports have a trade deficit.

References 

Net exports